Zobeda Khanum (1920 – 26 January 1989) was an educationist and litterateur of Bangladesh. She was the first director and chairperson of Bangladesh Shishu Academy. She was also vice chairperson and chairperson of Bangladesh Mahila Samity.

Early life
Khanum was born at Azharbagh in Kushtia District on 5 March 1920. His father Khandkar Azharul Islam was a school inspector. She started her primary education from a home tutor. After getting married she moved to Kolkata, where she appeared privately in the Matriculation, IA and BT examinations. She obtained a master's degree from University of Dhaka in 1950.

Literary works
Khanum wrote in several genres: novels, short stories, plays and juvenile literature.

Novels
 Abhishapta Prem (1959)
 Duti Ankhi Duti Tara (1963)
 Akasher Rang (1964)
 Banamarmar (1967)
 Ananta Pipasa (1967)

Short stories
 Ekti Surer Mrtyu (1974) (compilation)
 Jiban Ekti Durghatana (1981) (compilation)

Plays
 Jhader Svaksar (1967)
 Ore Bihanga (1968)

Juvenile literature
 Galpa Bali Shona (1966)
 Mahasamudra (1977)
 Sabas Sultana (1982)

Awards
 Agrani Bank Award for Juvenile Literature
 Ekushey Padak (2003)

References

1920 births
1989 deaths
Bangladeshi writers
20th-century Bangladeshi women writers
20th-century Bangladeshi writers
Recipients of the Ekushey Padak
Pakistani writers